Don De Grazia is a professor of Fiction Writing at Columbia College in Chicago, and is the author of the novel American Skin. Prior to publishing his first novel, he worked as a factory worker, bouncer and soldier. He lives in Chicago.

American Skin was originally published in the UK in 1998 by Jonathan Cape and in 1999 by Scribner.

References

External links
 Interview with Don De Grazia
 Richmond, Matt. (2000, April 17). "Faculty member De Grazia sells his novel to the movies". The Columbia Chronicle Online, 33(22)

American male writers
Living people
Year of birth missing (living people)